Grevillea robusta, commonly known as the southern silky oak, silk oak or silky oak, silver oak or Australian silver oak, is a flowering plant in the family Proteaceae. It is a tree, the largest species in its genus but is not closely related to the true oaks, Quercus. It is a native of eastern coastal Australia, growing in riverine, subtropical and dry rainforest environments.

Description
The bark is dark grey and furrowed. Each lobe is sometimes further divided into as many as four, each one linear to narrow triangular in shape. It loses many of its leaves just before flowering.

The flowers are glabrous and mostly yellowish orange, or sometimes reddish. Flowering occurs from September to November and the fruit that follows is a glabrous follicle.

Taxonomy and naming
Grevillea robusta was first formally described in 1830 by Robert Brown after an unpublished description by Allan Cunningham. The type specimen was collected by Cunningham on the eastern edge of Moreton Bay in 1827. Brown's description was published in Supplementum primum Prodromi florae Novae Hollandiae. The specific epithet (robusta) is a Latin word meaning "strong like oak" or "robust".

Distribution and habitat
Silky oak occurs naturally on the coast and ranges in southern Queensland and in New South Wales as far south as Coffs Harbour where it grows in subtropical rainforest, dry rainforest and wet forests. It is now relatively rare in its natural habitat but has been widely planted, including on Norfolk Island and Lord Howe Island. It has become naturalised in many places, including on the Atherton Tableland in Australia and in South Africa, New Zealand, Hawaii, French Polynesia, Jamaica and Florida. It is regarded as a weed in parts of New South Wales and Victoria, as "invasive" in Hawaii and as an "invader" in South Africa.

Uses
Before the advent of aluminium, Grevillea robusta timber was widely used for external window joinery, as it is resistant to wood rot. It has been used in the manufacture of furniture, cabinetry, and fences. Owing to declining G. robusta populations, felling has been restricted.

Recently G. robusta has been used for side and back woods on guitars made by Larrivée and others, because of its tonal and aesthetic qualities.

Cultivation
When young, it can be grown as a houseplant where it can tolerate light shade, but it prefers full sun because it grows best in warm zones. If planted outside, young trees need protection on frosty nights. It needs occasional water but is otherwise fairly drought-resistant. Care needs to be taken when planting it near bushland because it can be invasive.

G. robusta is often used as stock for grafting difficult-to-grow grevilleas. It has been planted widely throughout the city of Kunming in south-western China, forming shady avenues.

G. robusta is grown in plantations in South Africa, and can also be grown alongside maize in agroforestry systems.

In the UK, G. robusta has gained the Royal Horticultural Society's Award of Garden Merit.

Toxicity and allergic reactions
The flowers and fruit contain toxic hydrogen cyanide. Tridecylresorcinol in G.robusta is responsible for contact dermatitis.

References

External links

Plants of Hawaii (images): Grevillea robusta

robusta
Trees of Australia
Proteales of Australia
Flora of New South Wales
Flora of Queensland
Garden plants of Australia
Ornamental trees
Drought-tolerant trees
Plants described in 1830